Daniel Pemberton (born 3 November 1977) is an Academy Award-nominated and Emmy-winning English composer and songwriter.

Life and career
In 1994, at the age of 16, Pemberton recorded his debut album, Bedroom, on a multitrack cassette recorder, which caught the attention of ambient musician Pete Namlook and was released on the latter’s Fax label as part of its sub-label series.

This album impressed TV director Paul Wilmshurst who asked 17-year-old Pemberton to score a TV documentary he was working on. Following this he became a very in-demand composer for British television  eventually graduating into feature film  with his debut score to The Awakening from director Nick Murphy.

In 2013, Pemberton completed his breakthrough score of director Ridley Scott's film The Counselor. The score was recorded at Abbey Road Studios in London.

Since then he has worked on countless award winning films and songs with an array of highly notable film directors and artists, including Danny Boyle, Aaron Sorkin, Ridley Scott, David O. Russell, Darren Aronofsky, Guy Ritchie, Mick Jagger, Drake and Iggy Pop.

In 2021, he was named "Film Composer Of The Year" by the World Soundtrack Awards and International Film Music Critics Association.

Pemberton was originally named the "Discovery of the Year" in 2014 at the World Soundtrack Awards and nominated as "Film Composer of the Year" in 2016, 2019, 2021 and 2022.

Pemberton has been nominated for an Academy Award, won an Emmy Award and been nominated four times for a Golden Globe award and three times for a BAFTA Award. In 2021 he was nominated for the Academy Award For Best Original Song and Golden Globe Award for Best Original Song for the song Hear My Voice from the film The Trial of the Chicago 7 which was performed and co-written with Celeste. Pemberton and Celeste performed the song during the 2021 Oscars Ceremony from the roof of the newly opened  Academy Museum in Hollywood. A new arrangement of the song was also used as a central part of the Opening Ceremony of the 2022 Commonwealth Games featuring a 1000 piece choir and guitar solos  from Black Sabbath founder Tony Iommi. 

In 2016 his score for Steve Jobs was nominated for the Golden Globe Award for Best Original Score. In 2017 he was nominated for the Golden Globe Award for Best Original Song for the song Gold from the film of the same name which he co-wrote with Iggy Pop, Danger Mouse and the director Stephen Gaghan. In 2019 his score for Motherless Brooklyn was nominated for the Golden Globe Award for Best Original Score. He won an Emmy for his work on the acclaimed Paralympic documentary Rising Phoenix creating a score and song working alongside numerous musicians and artists with disabilities.

Pemberton's other notable works include the Oscar-winning animated film Spider-Man: Into the Spider-Verse, directed by Bob Persichetti, Peter Ramsey and Rodney Rothman; Danny Boyle's Steve Jobs and Yesterday; Ridley Scott's All The Money In The World and The Counselor; Aaron Sorkin's Being The Ricardos, Molly's Game and The Trial Of The Chicago 7; Oceans 8;The Rescue for which he won a Critics Choice Award for Best Score; Guy Ritchie's The Man From U.N.C.L.E. and King Arthur: Legend of the Sword; The Palme d'Or nominated French film Mal De Pierres starring Marion Cotillard and directed by Nicole Garcia; Animated Dreamworks feature 
The Bad Guys; Birds Of Prey And The Emancipation Of One Harley Quinn and Enola Holmes.

Earlier work includes The Awakening starring Rebecca Hall and Dominic West and directed by Nick Murphy; Cuban Fury a British comedy from the producers of Shaun of the Dead starring Nick Frost; the live action short Ghost Recon: Alpha directed by Oscar-winners Francois Alaux and Herve De Crecy and edited by Oscar-winner Pietro Scalia; Blood starring Paul Bettany and Mark Strong, directed by Nick Murphy and produced by Sam Mendes; Film4 feature In Fear starring Alice Englert, directed by Jeremy Lovering and Complicit starring David Oyelowo and directed by Niall MacCormick. Pemberton also scored director Gareth Edwards' breakthrough sci-fi short film Factory Farmed.

He has also composed title tunes and incidental music for several award-winning television series including The Game, Prey, Ambassadors, Peep Show, Desperate Romantics, Space Dive, Occupation, Prisoners' Wives, Black Mirror, My Mad Fat Diary, Suburban Shootout, Hell's Kitchen, Great British Menu, Hiroshima, Bad Lads' Army, That'll Teach 'Em, George Orwell: A Life in Pictures, The Yellow House, Monster Moves, Dirk Gently, Napoleon and the first series of the 2010 revival of Upstairs Downstairs. He also has composed music for video games such as LittleBigPlanet, Kinect Adventures, LittleBigPlanet 2, The Movies and Trackmania Turbo. Using the alias The Daniel Pemberton TV Orchestra, some of his television themes were released on the album TVPOPMUZIK in 2007, while his video game work—primarily that from LittleBigPlanet—was released on the album LittleBIGMusic.

For the 2020 Paralympics documentary film Rising Phoenix as well as working with disabled musicians on the score Pemberton also collaborated with disabled rappers Toni Hickman, Georgetragic and Keith Jones to create the end credits song "Rising Phoenix". which was also used in the closing ceremonies of both the 2020 Olympic and Paralympic Games.

Pemberton has also co-written songs such as "Jokes On You", the title track performed by Charlotte Lawrence from the film Birds Of Prey And The Emancipation Of One Harley Quinn; "Good Tonight"  performed by Antony Ramos and "Brand New Day" performed by The Heavy from the animated Dreamworks feature film The Bad Guys and the title theme "Come With Me" performed by Yola from the second Netflix series of Green Eggs And Ham. He co-wrote and produced the end titles song "Time" from the movie Amsterdam with Drake and performed by Giveon which was shortlisted for the 2023 Oscars.  

In 2022 he co-wrote and produced the title song "Strange Game" with Mick Jagger for the Apple TV series Slow Horses.

Film scores

Film

Television

Short film

Video games

Discography 

 Bedroom (Fax +49-69/450464, 1994)

Soundtrack releases
  Cries in the Wind ( the daniel pemberton TV orchestra ) ( little big planet October 21, 2008 / little big planet 2 January 18, 2011
  Yesterday (Universal Music & Capitol Records, 2019)
 Molly's Game (Sony Classical, 2018)
 All The Money In The World (Sony Classical, 2017)
 Mark Felt: The Man Who Brought Down The White House (Filmtrax Ltd., 2017)
 King Arthur: Legend of the Sword (WaterTower Music, 2017)
 Gold (BMG, Original Score, 2017)
 From The Land Of The Moon (Mal De Pierres) (Les Productions Du Tresor, 2017)
 Steve Jobs (Backlot Music, 2015)
 The Man From U.N.C.L.E. (Watertower, 2015)
 The Game (Moviescore Media, 2015)
 Cuban Fury (Decca Records, 2014)
 The Counselor (Milan Records, 2013)
 Blood (Moviescore Media, 2013)
 Space Dive (1812 Recordings, 2012)
 Dirk Gently (Moviescore Media, 2012)
 Space Dive (1812 Recordings, 2012)
 The Awakening (Moviescore Media/Screamworks, 2012)
 Desperate Romantics (1812 Recordings, 2012)
 LittleBIGMusic (1812 Recordings, 2011)
 The Haunted Airman (1812 Recordings, 2011)
 Upstairs Downstairs (1812 Recordings, 2010)
 Kinect Adventures (1812 Recordings, 2010)
 Monster Moves: Songs + Sounds (1812 Recordings, 2009)
 Heroes and Villains: Attila the Hun / Napoleon (Moviescore Media, 2009)
 TVPOPMUZIK (1812 Recordings, 2007)
 Prehistoric Park (1812 Recordings, 2006)

References

External links
  – official site
 
 
 
 Daniel Pemberton on scoring Ridley Scott's "The Counselor" at Film Music Reporter Daniel Pemberton feature by Paul Morley in The Guardian (2009)]
 Daniel Pemberton discussing his creative process at Think Work Play''

1977 births
Living people
British composers
British electronic musicians